Jenna Kanell is an American actress, director, writer, and stunt performer. She gained recognition for her portrayals of Tara Heyes in Terrifier (2016) and Kim Hansen in The Bye Bye Man (2017)—both horror films. Her film career has since expanded to a variety of genres such as the political drama The Front Runner (2018) and the horror-comedy Renfield (2023).

On television, Kanell has made appearances on shows such as the Disney+ miniseries WandaVision (2021) and the Showtime anthology series The First Lady (2022).

Career
Jenna Kanell delivered a TEDx Talk on the experience of writing, directing, and producing the short film “Bumblebees” alongside her disabled younger brother Vance Kanell. The project went on to screen at over forty film festivals and events around the world, winning numerous awards and bringing the siblings to speak at institutions such as Harvard Medical School.

Kanell gained recognition for her portrayal of Tara Heyes in Damien Leone's slasher film Terrifier (2016)—which obtained a cult following after its Netflix debut. Kanell later had a supporting role as Kim Hansen in Stacy Title's horror film The Bye Bye Man (2017), which received negative reviews. However, her performance was well-received; Variety wrote, "...the one who, all too briefly, steals the movie: Jenna Kanell." Both performances garnered comparisons to Neve Campbell's portrayals in The Craft (1996) and Scream (1996).

She has since starred in several significant short films, including "Max & the Monster", a dark comedy short film she wrote, directed, and produced which premiered on the opening night of the 2018 Austin Film Festival, and Ben Joyner’s sci-fi short film “Abducted”, which premiered at the 2021 Tribeca Film Festival.A Voice for the Innocent, a resource for survivors of abuse, incorporated the former film into their training at the time of release.

After her appearance in Marvel’s WandaVision in 2021, Looper spotlighted her in an article titled “Why The Med Tech In WandaVision Looks So Familiar”, calling her an “up-and-coming triple-threat...and general cinematic jack of all trades.”

Personal life
Jenna Kanell is a third generation American of Ashkenazi descent, with roots tracing back through Eastern Europe to the Middle East and the Mediterranean.

She openly identifies as a queer, gender non-conforming female, and uses she/her and they/them pronouns.  She has expressed socialist political views and has said that her moral compass is guided by ecofeminism. She’s practiced strict veganism for years, citing environmental racism, animal welfare, and bodily health as the prime motivators.

Filmography 

Music videos

 "This Is Our Life" by Des Rocs
 "These Days" by Highly Suspect.

Works cited

Notes

References

21st-century American actresses
Living people
Year of birth missing (living people)
Place of birth missing (living people)
American women film directors
21st-century American screenwriters
American women screenwriters
American stunt performers
American film actresses
American television actresses
American queer actresses
Ecofeminists